Egypt competed at the 2022 World Aquatics Championships in Budapest, Hungary from 18 June to 3 July.

Artistic swimming 

Women

Diving 

Men

Women

Swimming

Men

Women

References

Nations at the 2022 World Aquatics Championships
2022
World Aquatics Championships